The Funiculaire de Thonon-les-Bains, or Thonon-les-Bains Funicular, is a funicular railway in the spa town of Thonon-les-Bains, in the French département of Haute-Savoie. The line links the Belvedere, in the city centre, to the port of Rives, on the shores of Lake Geneva.

The funicular is managed by the Syndicat intercommunal des bus de l'agglomération thononaise (SIBAT), which is also responsible for the local bus service. It was opened in 1888. It has been renovated twice, first in 1951. 

After another renovation finished in 1989 a fully automated system designed by Poma was put into operation. It was the 1st of its kind in France.

The funicular has the following technical parameters:
Length: 
Height: 
Average steepness: 21 %
Capacity: 54 passengers per car
Haulage speed:

See also 
 List of funicular railways

References

External links

Funicular page on SIBAT web site

Thonon-les-Bains, Funiculaire de
Tourist attractions in Haute-Savoie
1100 mm gauge railways in France
Transport in Auvergne-Rhône-Alpes
Railway lines opened in 1888
Former water-powered funicular railways converted to electricity